"Southampton Dock" is a song from Pink Floyd's 1983 album, The Final Cut. In World War II, many soldiers departed from Southampton to fight against the Germans. In the eighties, Southampton was again used as a departure base, this time for the Falklands War. The song describes a woman who "bravely waves" the soldiers "Goodbye again".

The song includes a snippet of the theme from the track "It's Never Too Late", a song originally written and recorded for The Wall but was cut before the final band production demo of August 12, 1979. "It's Never Too Late" was later reworked and the melody was  incorporated into the second section of "Southampton Dock".

Roger Waters repeatedly performed the song on his solo tours; a live recording (prefaced by "Get Your Filthy Hands Off My Desert", another song from The Final Cut) appears on his album In the Flesh – Live.

Reception
In a review for The Final Cut, Patrick Schabe of PopMatters described "Southampton Dock" as an example of where the album works best, and described the song's imagery as "subtle, poetic, and effective."

Personnel 
Roger Waters – acoustic guitar, bass and vocals

with:

Michael Kamen – piano and orchestrations

References

1983 songs
Pink Floyd songs
Anti-war songs
Songs written by Roger Waters
Song recordings produced by Roger Waters

he:Southampton Dock